Robert William Pressley (born April 8, 1959) is an American former NASCAR driver who previously served as the promoter at Kingsport Speedway in Kingsport, Tennessee. Pressley is now a County Commissioner in Buncombe County, North Carolina.

Beginnings
Because his father, Bob, was a short track racer in Asheville, the younger Pressley naturally followed his father into the sport. In fact, his brother Charley, has been a long-time crew chief in the NASCAR level. Pressley began running at New Asheville Speedway and Greenville-Pickens Speedway and won championships at both tracks. He also put together 150 wins in various Late Model Series in the Southeast. In 1984, Pressley made his NASCAR debut in the Busch Series at Charlotte Motor Speedway, finishing 26th. Five years later, Pressley ran a limited schedule in the Busch Series, and won in just his twelfth series start at Orange County Speedway. He ran full seasons from 1991–1994, his best year coming in 1992 when he won races and finished fifth in points. In 1994, he ran three races in the Winston Cup Series in a car sponsored by Manheim Auctions, his best finish being a 31st at Charlotte.

In 1990 Pressley was involved in Michael Waltrip's horrific Bristol crash in which he tapped Waltrip from behind, sending Waltrip's #30 Kool-Aid car into a fence, disintegrating the car on impact.

Winston Cup

In 1995, Pressley took over for the retired Harry Gant in the #33 car owned by Leo Jackson Motorsports in Cup. He posted one top-ten finish and was runner-up to Ricky Craven for Rookie of the Year. The following year, he put together two top-five finishes. Unfortunately, Jackson was retiring and sold his operation to crew chief Andy Petree. After Pressley ran just one race for his new owner, he was released, but able to hook onto a ride with Diamond Ridge Motorsports. Pressley ran just ten races for Diamond Ridge in 1997, including the Daytona 500, in which his car flipped on its nose acrobatically in the first few laps. Pressley posted a season-best finish of 14th, when he was suddenly fired from the ride. While he waited for a Cup ride to appear, Pressley returned to the Busch ranks, running the No. 47 Chevrolet for ST Motorsports, and finished out the year with three top tens. Over in Cup, he joined the No. 77 Jasper Motorsports team, which became one of the more popular tandems in the Cup circuit among fans.

Following his abbreviated Cup run in 1997, Pressley returned full-time in 1998 with the Jasper team, where he posted a then career-best third-place finish at Texas Motor Speedway. Despite being replaced temporarily by Hut Stricklin due to injuries, Pressley finished 32nd in points that year. 1999 was a struggle however, as Pressley and company failed to qualify six times that season, and often had trouble finishing races. Following the addition of Ryan Pemberton in 2000, Pressley was able to increase his position in points to 25th. In 2001, he had five top-tens, nearly won the inaugural Tropicana 400 before finishing in second, and finished 25th in points handing the driving duties to the car for the road course events to Boris Said. Robert Pressley, although competitive in some races, struggled with consistency, and would part ways with Jasper at the conclusion of the 2001 season.

In 2002 he had a one race deal with Melling Racing for the Daytona 500 and locked himself in by qualifying speed on Pole Day, Qualifying 5th overall with the same car they had qualified 3rd or better on the 2001 restrictor plate tracks. After receiving sponsorship from Brand Source he had an engine problem at the end of the race. When he blew up, his car was nearly destroyed on pit road as an accident happened on the tri-oval and Michael Waltrip's car came across onto pit road, also nearly hitting the pace car as well.

Recent years
At the end of 2001, Pressley was released from Jasper, and he tackled a new venture, the Craftsman Truck Series. He signed with Bobby Hamilton Racing and won his Truck Series debut at Daytona International Speedway. He also ran the season opening Daytona 500 in Cup for what was the last race for Melling Racing, finishing 22nd. In 2003, Pressley moved to HT Motorsports in the Trucks, finishing 12th in points. He returned to the Busch Series to drive the 47 again for ST Motorsports, finishing in the top-ten twice, before moving back to the trucks with HT in 2005, finishing 20th in the standings.

His son Coleman Pressley won the 2010 UARA-Stars championship and raced sporadically in NASCAR. He currently serves as Joey Logano's spotter. His nephew Caleb Pressley is a blogger and podcaster for Barstool Sports.

Pressley served as promoter at the Kingsport (TN) Speedway from 2011-2014, moving the track to NASCAR Whelen All-American Series-sanctioned status beginning with his first season.  Pressley also owns a restaurant in the Asheville, North Carolina area called Celebrity's Hot Dogs.  

In 2016, Pressley was elected as a county commissioner in Buncombe County, North Carolina.

Motorsports career results

NASCAR
(key) (Bold – Pole position awarded by qualifying time. Italics – Pole position earned by points standings or practice time. * – Most laps led.)

Winston Cup Series

Daytona 500

Busch Series

Craftsman Truck Series

ARCA Permatex SuperCar Series
(key) (Bold – Pole position awarded by qualifying time. Italics – Pole position earned by points standings or practice time. * – Most laps led.)

References

External links
 
 
 Racer Profile:Robert Pressley

Living people
1959 births
North Carolina Republicans
Sportspeople from Asheville, North Carolina
Racing drivers from North Carolina
NASCAR drivers
American Speed Association drivers
ISCARS Dash Touring Series drivers
ARCA Menards Series drivers